Olaf Kapagiannidis (born 11 June 1969 in Berlin-Spandau) is a former professional German footballer.

Kapagiannidis made 50 appearances in the 2. Fußball-Bundesliga for Tennis Borussia Berlin during his playing career.

References

External links 
 

1969 births
Living people
Footballers from Berlin
German people of Greek descent
German footballers
Association football defenders
2. Bundesliga players
Füchse Berlin Reinickendorf players
Türkiyemspor Berlin players
Tennis Borussia Berlin players
FC Sachsen Leipzig players
Hertha BSC II players